Events from the year 1892 in the United States.

Incumbents

Federal Government 
 President: Benjamin Harrison (R-Indiana)
 Vice President: Levi P. Morton (R-New York)
 Chief Justice: Melville Fuller (Illinois)
 Speaker of the House of Representatives: Charles Frederick Crisp (D-Georgia)
 Congress: 52nd

Events

January–March
 January 1 – Ellis Island begins receiving immigrants to the United States.
 January 15 – James Naismith's rules for basketball are published for the first time in the Springfield YMCA International Training School's newspaper, in an article titled "A New Game".
 January 20 – At the YMCA in Springfield, Massachusetts, the first official basketball game is played.
 February 12 – Former President Abraham Lincoln's birthday is declared a national public holiday in the United States.
 February 18 – Pennsauken Township, New Jersey is incorporated.
 February 23 – The 7.1–7.2  Laguna Salada earthquake shakes Southern California and northern Mexico with a maximum Mercalli intensity of VIII (Severe).
 March 15 – Jesse W. Reno patents the first working escalator, used at Old Iron Pier, Coney Island , New York City.

April–June
 April – The Johnson County War breaks out between small farmers and large ranchers in Wyoming.
 April 15 – The General Electric Company is established through merger of the Thomson-Houston Company and the Edison General Electric Company.
 April 19 – The 6.4 MLa Vacaville–Winters earthquake shakes the North Bay are of California with a maximum Mercalli intensity of IX (Violent). This first event in a doublet earthquake results in one death and is followed two days later by a 6.2 MLa shock. Total damage from the events is $225,000–250,000.
 April 29 – Redondo Beach, California, is founded.
 April 30 – Lynching of Ephraim Grizzard, an African American, in Nashville, Tennessee.
 May 10 - Glen Ellyn, Illinois is incorporated.
 May 28 – The Sierra Club is organized by John Muir in San Francisco, California.
 June 6 – The Chicago "L" elevated railway opens.
 June 7 – Homer Plessy, who is one-eighth African heritage with light skin, is arrested for sitting (deliberately) on the whites-only car in Louisiana, leading to the landmark Plessy v. Ferguson court case.
 June 30 – The Homestead Strike begins in Homestead, Pennsylvania, culminating in a battle between striking workers and private security agents on July 6.

July–September
 July 4 – Samoa changes its time zone to being 3 hours behind California, such that it crosses the international date line and July 4 occurs twice.
 July 6 – Homestead Strike: The arrival of a force of 300 Pinkerton detectives from New York City and Chicago results in a fight in which about 10 men are killed.
 August 4 – The father and stepmother of Lizzie Borden are found violently murdered in their Fall River, Massachusetts home; she will be acquitted of their murder.
 August 9 – Thomas Edison receives a patent for a two-way telegraph.
 August 13 – The Baltimore Afro-American newspaper, the country's longest-running African American family owned newspaper business, publishes its first issue (publisher, John H. Murphy, Sr.).

October–December
 October 5 – The Dalton Gang, attempting to rob two banks in Coffeyville, Kansas, is shot by the townspeople; only Emmett Dalton, with 23 wounds, survives to spend 14 years in prison.
 October 12 – To mark the 400th anniversary Columbus Day holiday, the "Pledge of Allegiance" is first recited in unison by students in U.S. public schools.
 October 24 – Boston Beaneaters win their Fifth National League Pennant by defeating Cleveland Spiders 5 games to 0.
 November 8 
1892 U.S. presidential election: Grover Cleveland is elected over Benjamin Harrison and James B. Weaver to win the second of his non-consecutive terms.
The four-day New Orleans General Strike begins.
 November 12 – Pudge Heffelfinger is paid $525 by the Allegheny Athletic Association, becoming the first professional American football player on record.
 December 17 – Vogue magazine launched.

Undated
 Shredded wheat breakfast cereal first sold to restaurants by Henry Perky.
 Ithaca College founded as Ithaca Conservatory of Music in New York (state) by William Grant Egbert.
 Lowell High School is founded in Lowell, Indiana.
 Aberdeen, Maryland, is founded.
 The Cadet Band (modern-day Highty-Tighties) of the Virginia Agricultural and Mechanical College (modern-day Virginia Tech) is established in the Virginia Tech Corps of Cadets.

Ongoing
 Garza Revolution in Texas and Mexico (1891–1893)
 Gilded Age (1869–c. 1896)
 Gay Nineties (1890–1899)
 Progressive Era (1890s–1920s)

Births
 January 9 – Eva Bowring, U.S. Senator from Nebraska in 1954 (died 1985)
 January 14 – Hal Roach, film and television producer, director and actor (died 1992)
 January 16
 Homer Burton Adkins, chemist (died 1949)
 Charles W. Ryder, general (died 1960)
 William A. Stanfill, U.S. Senator from Kentucky from 1945 to 1946 (died 1971)
 February 19 – Scott W. Lucas, U.S. Senator from Illinois from 1939 to 1951 (died 1968)
 February 29 – Augusta Savage, African American sculptor (died 1962)
 March 26 – Paul Douglas, U.S. Senator from Illinois from 1949 to 1967 (died 1976)
 April 8 – Rose McConnell Long, U.S. Senator from Louisiana from 1936 to 1937 (died 1970)
 May 10 – Arthur E. Nelson, U.S. Senator from Minnesota from 1942 to 1943 (died 1955)
 May 20 – Harry J. Anslinger, 1st Commissioner of the Federal Bureau of Narcotics (died 1975)
 May 26 – Maxwell Bodenheim, poet and novelist (murdered 1954)
 June 6 – Donald F. Duncan, Sr., toymaker and businessman, founder of Duncan Toys Company (died 1971)
 June 15 – Wallace Wade, American football coach, University of Alabama, Duke University (died 1986)
 July 10 – Spessard Holland, U.S. Senator from Florida from 1946 to 1971 (died 1971)
 July 29 – William Powell, film actor (died 1984)
 August 20 – George Aiken, U.S. Senator from Vermont from 1941 to 1975 (died 1984)
 August 23 – Alexander G. Barry, U.S. Senator from Oregon from 1938 to 1939 (died 1952)
 October 6 – Jackie Saunders, silent film actress (died 1954)
 November 10 – Frank A. Barrett, U.S. Senator from Wyoming from 1953 to 1959 (died 1962)
 December 15 – J. Paul Getty, industrialist (died 1976)

Deaths
 January 2 – Montgomery C. Meigs, career U.S. Army officer and civil engineer, Quartermaster General of the United States Army during and after the American Civil War (born 1816)
 February 28 – Elias Nelson Conway, 5th Governor of Arkansas from 1852 to 1860 (born 1812)
 March 26 – Walt Whitman, poet, author of Leaves of Grass (born 1819).
 April 6 – Willard Saulsbury, Sr., U.S. Senator from Delaware from 1873 to 1892 (born 1820)
 May 14 – John S. Barbour, Jr., U.S. Senator from Virginia from 1889 to 1892 (born 1820)
 June 8 – Robert Ford, outlaw, killer of Jesse James (born 1862)
 July 14 – Newton Booth, U.S. Senator from California from 1875 to 1881 (born 1825)
 August 16 – Thomas H. Watts, 18th Governor of Alabama, 3rd Confederate States Attorney General (born 1819)
 September 23 – John Pope, career U.S. Army officer and Union general in the Civil War (born 1822)
 October 5 – outlaw members of Dalton Gang (shot)
 Bob Dalton (born 1869)
 Grat Dalton (born 1861)
 October 18 – William W. Chapman, politician and lawyer (born 1808)
 October 25 – Caroline Harrison, First Lady of the United States as wife of President Benjamin Harrison (born 1832)
 November 29 – Graham N. Fitch, U.S. Senator from Indiana from 1857 to 1861 (born 1809)
 December 2 – Jay Gould, railroad developer and speculator (born 1836)
 December 15 – Randall L. Gibson, U.S. Senator from Louisiana from 1883 to 1892 (born 1832)
 December 31 – Henry P. Baldwin, Governor of Michigan from 1869 to 1873 and U.S. Senator from Michigan from 1879 to 1881 (born 1814)
 Zenas King, bridge builder (born 1818)

See also
 List of American films of the 1890s
 Timeline of United States history (1860–1899)

References

External links
 

 
1890s in the United States
United States
United States
Years of the 19th century in the United States